Jiji P Joseph, also known as Jijimon Joseph (born 5 March 1981) is a location sound recordist, sound designer and film editor in Indian film industry.  He won the first ever Kerala State Film Award 2014 for location sound recording for the film Oraalppokkam and the consecutive year for the film Ozhivudivasathe Kali in fraternization with Sandeep Kurissery (now known as Sandeep Madhavam). He has fashioned his film career collaborating on feature films and short films in Malayalam cinema.

Biography
Jiji Panaparampil Joseph was born in Kanjirappally, Kerala, India to Joseph Varghese and Mariyamma Joseph, the youngest of four children. The dynamics and technicalities of film making was always a fascinating part of his dream and he had dreamed of being a part of the feature films. At the completion of schooling, he obtained diplomas in multimedia and computer hardware. Later, he gained an advanced diploma in digital editing and audio engineering from Keltron Advanced Training Centre, Sasthamangalam, Trivandrum.

Career
He started his career as a cable network technician in his neighborhood. After 7 years of satellite communication service, he began his professional career as a video editor in Shalom TV in 2008. He moved to Manorama News (MMTV) in 2009 and continued the same profession until 2011. He also served as senior video editor in Goodness TV from 2012 through 2014.

Career in films
In 2010, he committed for the first time to collaborate with a short film Will you be there? by Sandeep Kurissery and in 2013, he worked along with Sandeep as location sound recordist and editor for another short film Amguleechaalitham ("Manipulated by fingers") by Prasanth Vijay. In 2014, in collaboration with Sandeep, he did the location sound for the first feature film Oraalppokkam ("Six Feet High") directed by Sanal Kumar Sasidharan, that brought him the Kerala State Film Award for the Best Sync Sound (location sound) in 2014. The following year, he committed his second project again with Sanal Kumar Sasidharan for his feature film Ozhivudivasathe Kali ("An Off day Game") that carried for a second time the Kerala State Film Award 2015 for the Best Sync Sound. In 2015, he did the location sound for the film Savam ("The Corpse") directed by Don Palathra. He recorded the location sound for the Marathi/Hindi film Eli Eli Lama Sabachthani? ("The Forsaken") directed by Jiju Antony in 2016. He worked as location sound recordist, sound designer (along with Sandeep Kurissery) and film editor in the feature film Athisayangalude Venal ("The Summer of Miracles") directed by Prasanth Vijay in 2017.

Personal life
Jiji is married to Sonia. The couple have two children, Elon J Joseph and Eian J Joseph. He belongs from Chotty, a small village situated between Kanjirappally and Mundakayam, in the district of Kottayam, Kerala, India. He lives in Taunton, Somerset, United Kingdom.

Filmography and awards

Film festivals
Eli Eli Lama Sabacthani - Mumbai Film Festival - Official Selection, October 2017 
Athisayangalude Venal - Mumbai Film Festival - Official Selection, October 2017
Athisayangalude Venal - Kerala Film Festival - Official Selection, December 2017

References

External links
M3DB Database-Jiji P Joseph
Internet Movie Database (IMDb)-Jiji P Joseph
BrownHorse Productions
Congratulatory Tweet Resul Pookutty
Congratulatory Tweet Meena Kandasamy
Kerala State Film Award 2014 Kerala State Chalachithra Academy
Kerala State Film Award 2015 Kerala State Chalachithra Academy
Award Receiving Ceremony 2015 Kerala State Chalachithra Academy

1981 births
Living people
Indian audio engineers
Film editors from Kerala
Kerala State Film Award winners
Film musicians from Kerala
Malayalam film editors
People from Kottayam district
Production sound mixers